Edmund C. Clark  (1863–1927), was a professional baseball player who pitched in the Major Leagues for the 1886 Philadelphia Athletics in one game and pitched in one game in the Major Leagues for the 1891 Columbus Solons.

References

External links

1863 births
1927 deaths
Major League Baseball pitchers
Baseball players from Ohio
19th-century baseball players
Philadelphia Athletics (AA) players
Columbus Solons players
Dayton Gem Citys players
Portsmouth Riversides players
Columbus Stars (baseball) players
Oswego Starchboxes players
Charleston Seagulls players
Chattanooga Lookouts players
New Orleans Pelicans (baseball) players
Roanoke Magicians players
Dallas Steers players
Ironton (minor league baseball) players